Xu Yanmei may refer to:

 Xu Yanmei (diver) (born 1971), Chinese diver
 Xu Yanmei (powerlifter), Chinese Paralympic powerlifter